Knowledge was a British weekly educational magazine for children which was assembled in blue binders into an encyclopedia.

History and profile
The magazine was launched by Purnell and Sons on 9 January 1961, as "Knowledge: the new colour magazine which grows into an encyclopædia" (subsequently "the colour magazine which grows into an encyclopædia") at a price of two shillings per issue (the pre-decimal equivalent of 10p; a later re-issued run was priced as 2/6 or 12½p). Sixteen volumes of twelve issues each were initially planned, but two additional volumes brought the total to eighteen. There was also a four-volume alphabetical topic guide in slightly smaller yellow binders, also assembled from parts inserted into the main magazine.

The majority of the covers of the first 192 issues (volumes 1-16) were the work of illustrator Alessandro Fedini, but the covers of the additional issues 193-216 (volumes 17 and 18) depicted twentieth-century events and news headlines.

Knowledge was a British version of the Italian magazine Conoscere published by Fratelli Fabbri Editori of Milan. The concept of a British edition had first been pitched to Fleetway Publications Ltd who turned it down, fearing it would damage sales of their own The Children's Encyclopædia and The Children's Newspaper. Following the success of Knowledge, Fleetway brought out Look and Learn in 1962.

Knowledge sold 400,000 copies and was edited by John Paget Chancellor (1927–2014), son of Sir Christopher Chancellor, father of actress Anna Chancellor and financial historian Edward Chancellor, and brother of journalist Alexander Chancellor. The advisory editorial board of Knowledge was Christopher N. L. Brooke M.A., Violet Bonham Carter D.B.E, Norman Fisher M.A., Walter Hamilton M.A., John Sparrow M.A., L. Dudley Stamp C.B.E. D.Sc., and George Thomson F.R.S. D.Sc. In later editions John Chancellor became editor-in-chief with William Armstrong B.A. as editor and Christopher Falkus B.A. (son of Hugh Falkus) as assistant editor. The magazine ceased publication in 1966.

It was also printed and published as a set of 18 hardcover books, Knowledge: the new colour encyclopaedia (Volumes IXVIII), that came with an index of all 18 volumes in a separate booklet.

References

Children's magazines published in the United Kingdom
Weekly magazines published in the United Kingdom
Defunct magazines published in the United Kingdom
Magazines established in 1961
Magazines disestablished in 1966
Education magazines
Partworks
British encyclopedias
Children's encyclopedias